The deputy prime minister of Canada  is a minister of the Crown and a member of the Canadian Cabinet. The office is conferred at the discretion of the prime minister and does not have an associated departmental portfolio. Canadian deputy prime ministers are appointed to the Privy Council and styled as the Honourable, a privilege maintained for life.  

Chrystia Freeland is the tenth and current deputy prime minister of Canada, having assumed the role on November 20, 2019. She serves concurrently as the minister of finance, and was the minister of foreign affairs before Prime Minister Justin Trudeau elevated her to the position of deputy prime minister following the 2019 federal election. The post was vacant from 2006 to 2019.

The deputy prime minister should not be confused with the position of the clerk of the Privy Council, who is effectively the deputy minister (the senior civil servant in a department) of the prime minister's department (which is the Privy Council Office).

History
The position of deputy prime minister was created by Pierre Trudeau in 1977, largely to recognize the long years of service of Allan MacEachen. Before then, Trudeau had given the title of senior minister to a member of his cabinet. The last to occupy that position was Paul Hellyer.

Joe Clark's government did not have a deputy prime minister. Similarly, Prime Minister Stephen Harper did not designate a deputy prime minister, nor did Prime Minister Justin Trudeau until the appointment of Chrystia Freeland in his second mandate. Prior to Freeland's appointment, Canada's most recent deputy prime minister was Anne McLellan, who in 2006, was also the first deputy prime minister to lose her seat in the House of Commons. 

Harper gave special status in the line of authority to members of his cabinet: under an Order in Council issued on February 6, 2006—the day Harper was appointed prime minister—when "the prime minister is unable to perform the functions of his office", Lawrence Cannon, then Jim Prentice, then the balance of the Cabinet by order of precedence, were "authorized to act for the prime minister". This order was followed by a number of others updating the list; in each case, the status as the top person on that list was accorded to the vice-chair of the cabinet's Priorities and Planning Committee. Previous prime ministers have had similar orders-in-council, under which the deputy prime minister and then the balance of the Cabinet, in order of precedence, have been authorized to act for the prime minister. Media analysts generally credited the top person on these lists as being the de facto deputy prime minister, although the title was never conferred. These "order of precedence" lists have no status as a formal line of succession, however, and would carry no special weight in determining who would take over as the new prime minister if an incumbent died in office or was forced to suddenly resign in advance of a leadership convention.

Cannon seconded the pro forma bill to start the first session of the 39th Canadian Parliament; the bill is introduced before the House takes the Speech from the Throne under consideration to maintain the right of the House to consider matters other than those directed to it by the crown. Traditionally, either the deputy prime minister or government house leader seconds this bill.

Similarly, no deputy prime minister was named in the first cabinet of incumbent prime minister Justin Trudeau. Ralph Goodale was deputy leader of the Liberal Party and had been ranked first in the "order of precedence" in the cabinet, and an order in council designated him as first in line to assume the prime minister's duties in the event Trudeau ever became incapacitated. However, media analysts focused on Dominic Leblanc, who despite having been lower in the official order of precedence served on numerous cabinet committees and as the government's liaison with the Senate, as being the "de facto deputy prime minister".

Following the 2019 federal election, which saw the Liberals returned to power in a minority government but being shut out of the western provinces of Alberta and Saskatchewan, Goodale was defeated in the Saskatchewan riding of Regina—Wascana, while Leblanc was reelected in his New Brunswick riding of Beauséjour but on medical leave due to recovery from cancer treatment. The Liberals were pressed to respond to concerns about lack of representation in cabinet from the prairie provinces potentially driving sentiments of western alienation. On November 20, 2019, Trudeau appointed Chrystia Freeland, who represents the Toronto riding of University—Rosedale in Parliament but was born in Peace River, Alberta and grew up in Alberta, as the deputy prime minister.

Duties
The official duties of the deputy prime minister are to answer questions pertaining to overall government policy during Question Period and to chair the Cabinet in the absence of the prime minister. The office has no standing in law and does not carry any formal duties or tasks—that is, it is without a portfolio—though, the prime minister may negotiate or assign specific tasks in conjunction with the title. With the exception of Herb Gray, all deputy prime ministers have held another ministerial portfolio alongside this title.

According to journalist Joseph Brean of the Postmedia Network, the role can sometimes be "a poisoned chalice, or a leash to keep a rival under close control" rather than an indication that the Prime Minister trusts the authority of the deputy. For the political analysis magazine Policy Options Eugene Lang and Greg Schmidt describe the role as one of "soft power", in which a deputy prime minister only carries as much or as little power within a government as the prime minister chooses to permit them; the level of power is usually communicated less by the deputy prime minister's title itself, and more by what other roles they do or don't hold alongside it.

One deputy prime minister, Sheila Copps, attracted controversy in 1993 after asserting that she was "in charge" of government business while the then prime minister, Jean Chrétien, was on a brief holiday. After she left politics, she wrote that although the position of deputy prime minister is only ceremonial, "very often, the DPM's job was to protect the prime minister from the political damage that Question Period can inflict on a leader", further citing the experience of Erik Nielsen during the Sinclair Stevens scandal.

Succession
Unlike the role of vice president in some presidential systems, the deputy prime minister does not automatically assume the office of prime minister if the incumbent of the latter office dies or resigns. Although they may serve in an acting capacity on a temporary caretaker basis to ensure continuity of government function during the immediate period of transition, the deputy prime minister does not automatically become the new permanent prime minister; rather, constitutional convention requires the governor general to consult the governing party regarding the leadership, and to call on a member of that party's caucus to assume the prime ministership. No policy or convention precludes the deputy prime minister from being chosen as the new prime minister in such a scenario, but none assures it, either—the party caucus would be free to recommend any new leader of its choice to the governor general. Barring extraordinary circumstances, the governor general is expected to follow the wishes of the party, although officially they retain the authority to make the final decision. That being the case, no prime minister has died in office or resigned suddenly (except following his or her party's electoral defeat) since the 1890s, many decades before the office of deputy prime minister was created.

Extended notice is usually given when a sitting prime minister does not plan to lead his/her party into another election. Leadership contests to determine the successor to a prime minister are usually held during the final days of the incumbent's term, and are traditionally a lengthy and competitive process. In almost all cases, the outgoing prime minister hands over power directly to their designated successor, without any interim prime minister. By contrast, during leadership contests for the official opposition party, the leader of the opposition has often (though not always) been occupied by an interim parliamentary leader. The opposition party's deputy leader (assuming that post is occupied) is often chosen for this role unless they plan to run in the leadership election, in which case someone else would be chosen since it would be considered harmful to the election process if the interim leader was to be one of the candidates.

Legally speaking, any interim prime minister appointed by the governor general would not merely be acting on behalf of the prime minister, but would have the full powers and prerogatives of any other prime minister.

List of deputy prime ministers
Key:

Acting prime minister

Prior to the creation of the position of deputy prime minister, a prime minister would routinely name a member of the cabinet to temporarily act on the prime minister's behalf while the prime minister was away from the regular duties of his job for a period of time, such as being out of the country on a working visit or a vacation. The delegate was thus a caretaker, whose role was to oversee the routine day-to-day functioning of the government and cabinet during the prime minister's absence; for example, in his capacity as acting prime minister, Mitchell Sharp ordered a precautionary one-day shutdown of government offices in Ottawa on August 20, 1970, as the storm that had spawned the Sudbury tornado headed toward Ottawa. An acting prime minister did not otherwise have the authority to act independently of the sitting prime minister in a legislative or political capacity, nor would an acting prime minister be considered to have actually served as prime minister. As well the acting prime minister was not given the title The Right Honourable, even during the acting period, although some people who served as acting prime ministers may have independently earned that distinction for other reasons.

Due to the routine and relatively minor nature of the role, few to no research sources exist to provide a complete list of everyone who was ever named as acting prime minister. However, John Diefenbaker's selection of Ellen Fairclough as acting prime minister on February 19 and 20, 1958, is historically noteworthy as Fairclough was the first woman ever designated.

Senior Minister

Prior to the creation of this position, the position of "Senior Minister" was a ceremonial position used in a similar manner, heading the order of precedence. Upon the absence of the prime minister, the senior minister would act on behalf of the prime minister.

See also 
Deputy Premier (Canada)

Notes

References

External links
 Official website
 Parliament of Canada page

Canada